Matti Keskinarkaus (born 28 February 1976) is a Finnish ski-orienteering and mountain bike orienteering competitor. He is ski-O world champion and winner of the overall ski-O world cup year 2001.

Ski Orienteering career
He received a gold medal in the long course at the 2002 World Ski Orienteering Championships in Borovetz, and a gold medal in Levi, Finland in 2005.

He has received two gold medals and one silver medal at the Junior World Ski Orienteering Championships

He finished overall first in the World Cup in Ski Orienteering in 2001.

Mountain Bike Orienteering career
Matti received a gold medal in middle distance European Championships year 2006.

See also
 Finnish orienteers
 List of orienteers
 List of orienteering events

References 

1976 births
Living people
Finnish orienteers
Male orienteers
Ski-orienteers
Mountain bike orienteers
Finnish male cyclists
Finnish mountain bikers